Scafells, also known as the Scafell Massif, range of fells in the western English Lake District, made up of the remains of a caldera volcano. Fells in the range include Scafell, England's tallest mountain Scafell Pike, Broad Crag and Ill Crag. Great End, Lingmell and Slight Side are also usually included within the definition. These hills form part of the Southern Fells.

Geology 
Geologically, the Scafells are the remnants of a volcano that erupted in the Ordovician period over 400 million years ago. This volcano as well as all other volcanoes of the Lake District are long since extinct.

The volcano is an example of a piecemeal caldera whose collapse, in contrast with a wholesale piston-like subsidence, occurred in a piece-by-piece fashion along faults and whose measurements suggest formation from an eruption of a VEI-7 magnitude. The Scafell Dacite, between Little Narrowcove and Aaron Crags, is a lava dome formed during the last stages of volcanic activity at Scafells.

Gallery

References

Calderas of England
Fells of the Lake District
Ordovician volcanoes
VEI-7 volcanoes